"" ("The Song of the Italians") is a canto written by Goffredo Mameli set to music by Michele Novaro in 1847,  and is the current national anthem of Italy. It is best known among Italians as the "" ("Mameli's Hymn"), after the author of the lyrics, or "" ("Brothers of Italy"), from its opening line. The piece, in a time signature of 4/4 and the key of B-flat major, consists of six strophes, and a refrain sung at the end of each strophe. The sixth group of verses, which is almost never performed, recalls the text of the first strophe.

The song was very popular during the unification of Italy and in the following decades, although after the proclamation of the Kingdom of Italy (1861) the "Marcia Reale" (Royal March), the official hymn of the House of Savoy composed in 1831 by order of King Charles Albert of Sardinia, was chosen as the anthem of the Kingdom of Italy. "Fratelli d'Italia", of clear republican and Jacobin connotation, was difficult to reconcile with the outcome of the unification of Italy, a monarchy.

After the Second World War, Italy became a republic, and "Il Canto degli Italiani" was chosen, on 12 October 1946, as a provisional national anthem, a role that it later preserved while remaining the de facto anthem of the Italian Republic. Over the decades there were several unsuccessful attempts to make it the official national anthem, until it finally gained de jure status on 4 December 2017.

History

Origins

The text of "Il Canto degli Italiani" was written by the Genoese Goffredo Mameli, then a young student and a fervent patriot, in a historical context characterized by that widespread patriotism that already heralded the revolutions of 1848 and the First Italian War of Independence (1848-1849).

On the precise date of the drafting of the text, the sources differ: according to some scholars, the hymn was written by Mameli on 10 September 1847, while according to others the date of birth of the composition was two days before, 8 September.

After having discarded the idea of adapting it to existing music, 10 November 1847 Goffredo Mameli sent the text of the hymn to Turin to set it to music by the Genoese composer Michele Novaro, who was in the house at that time of the patriot Lorenzo Valerio.

Novaro was immediately conquered and, on 24 November 1847, he decided to set it to music. Thus Anton Giulio Barrili, patriot and poet, remembered in April 1875, during a commemoration of Mameli, the words of Novaro on the birth of the music of "Il Canto degli Italiani":

Mameli, who was Republican, Jacobin and supporter of the motto born from the French Revolution liberté, égalité, fraternité, to write the text of "Il Canto degli Italiani" was inspired by the French national anthem, "La Marseillaise". For example, "" recalls the verse of the "La Marseillaise", "" ("Form your battalions").

There was another verse in the first version of "Il Canto degli Italiani" that was dedicated to Italian women. The verse, eliminated by Mameli himself before the official debut of the hymn, read: "Tessete o fanciulle / bandiere e coccarde / fan l'alme gagliarde / l'invito d'amor. (. English: Weave maidens / flags and cockades / they make souls gallant / the invitation of love.)"

In the original version of the hymn, the first verse of the first verse read "Hurray Italy", Mameli then changed it to "Fratelli d'Italia" almost certainly at the suggestion of Michele Novaro himself. The latter, when he received the manuscript, also added a rebellious "Yes!" at the end of the refrain sung after the last strophe.

Debut

On this occasion the flag of Italy was shown and Mameli's hymn was publicly sung for the first time. It was played by the Filarmonica Sestrese, then municipal band of Sestri Ponente, in front of a part of those 30 000 patriots - coming from all over Italy - who had come to Genoa for the event. On 18 December 1847 the newspaper L'Italia of Pisa published this news from Turin:

There was perhaps a previous public rendition, of which the original documentation was lost, by the Filarmonica Voltrese founded by Nicola Mameli, brother of Goffredo, on 9 November 1847 in Genoa. In this first public performance the first version of "Il Canto degli Italiani" was sung, later modified in the definitive version. Being its notoriously Mazzinian author, the piece was forbidden by the Savoy police until March 1848: its execution was also forbidden by the Austrian police, which also pursued its singing interpretation - considered a political crime - until the end of the First World War.

There are two autograph manuscripts up to the 21st century; the first, the original one linked to the first draft, with hand annotations by Mameli himself, is located at the Mazzinian Institute of Genoa, while the second, sent by Mameli on 10 November 1847 to Novaro, is kept at the Museo del Risorgimento in Turin. The autograph manuscript that Novaro sent to the publisher Francesco Lucca is instead located in the Ricordi Historical Archive. The sheet that is found at Istituto Mazziniano, subsequent to the two manuscripts, lacks the last strophe ("Son giunchi che piegano...") for fear of censorship. These leaflets were to be distributed at the 10 December demonstration, in Genoa. The hymn was also printed on leaflets in Genoa, by the printing office Casamara.

The following decades

When "Il Canto degli Italiani" debuted, there were only a few months left to the revolutions of 1848. Shortly before the promulgation of the Statuto Albertino, the constitution that Charles Albert of Sardinia conceded to the Kingdom of Sardinia in Italy on 4 March 1848, a coercive law had been abrogated that prohibited gatherings of more than ten people. From this moment on, "Il Canto degli Italiani" experienced a growing success thanks to its catchiness, which facilitated its diffusion among the population. After 10 December the hymn spread all over the Italian peninsula, brought by the same patriots that participated in the Genoa demonstration. In the 1848, Mameli's hymn was very popular among the Italian people and it was commonly sung during demonstrations, protests and revolts as a symbol of the Italian unification in most parts of Italy.

When "Il Canto degli Italiani" became popular, the Savoy authorities censored the fifth strophe, extremely harsh with the Austrians; however after the declaration of war to Austrian Empire and the beginning of the First Italian War of Independence (1848-1849), the soldiers and the Savoy military bands performed it so frequently that King Charles Albert was forced to withdraw all censorship. The anthem was in fact widespread, especially among the ranks of the Republican volunteers.

In the Five Days of Milan, the rebels sang "Il Canto degli Italiani" during clashes against the Austrian Empire and was sung frequently during the celebrations for the promulgation, by Charles Albert of Sardinia, of the Statuto Albertino (also in 1848). Even the brief experience of the Roman Republic (1849) had, among the hymns most sung by the volunteers, "Il Canto degli Italiani", with Giuseppe Garibaldi who used to hum and whistle it during the defense of Rome and the flight to Venice. In the 1860, the corps of volunteers led by Giuseppe Garibaldi used to sing the hymn in the battles against the Bourbons in Sicily and Southern Italy during the Expedition of the Thousand. Giuseppe Verdi, in his Inno delle nazioni ("Hymn of the nations"), composed for the London International Exhibition of 1862, chose "Il Canto degli Italiani" to represent Italy, putting it beside "God Save the Queen" and "La Marseillaise".

From the unification of Italy to the First World War

After the proclamation of the Kingdom of Italy (1861) the "Marcia Reale" ("Royal March"), composed in 1831, was chosen as the national anthem of unified Italy: the decision was taken because "Il Canto degli Italiani", which had too little conservative contents and was characterized by a strong republican imprint and Jacobin, did not combine with the epilogue of the unification of Italy, of monarchical origin. The references to the republican creed of Mameli - which was in fact Mazzinian - were, however, more historical than political; on the other hand, the "Il Canto degli Italiani" was disliked also by the socialist and anarchist circles, which considered it instead the opposite, that is too little revolutionary. 

The song was one of the most common songs during the Third Italian War of Independence (1866), and even the Capture of Rome on 20 September 1870, the last part of the Italian unification, was accompanied by choirs that sang it together with Bella Gigogin and the "Marcia Reale"; on this occasion, "Il Canto degli Italiani" was often performed also by the fanfare of the Bersaglieri.

Even after the end of the Italian unification, "Il Canto degli Italiani", which was taught in schools, remained very popular among Italians, but it was joined by other musical pieces that were connected to the political and social situation of the time as, for example, the "Inno dei lavoratori" ("Hymn of the workers") or "Goodbye to Lugano", which partly obscured the popularity of the hymns used during Italian unification (including "Il Canto degli Italiani"), since they had a meaning more related to everyday problems.

"Fratelli d'Italia", thanks to references to patriotism and armed struggle, returned to success during the Italo-Turkish War (1911–1912), where it joined "A Tripoli", and in the trenches of the First World War (1915–1918): the Italian irredentism that characterized it indeed found a symbol in "Il Canto degli Italiani", although in the years following the last war context cited he would have been preferred, in the patriotic ambit, musical pieces of greater military style such as "La Leggenda del Piave", the "Canzone del Grappa" or "La campana di San Giusto". Shortly after Italy entered the First World War, on 25 July 1915, Arturo Toscanini performed "Il Canto degli Italiani" during an interventionist demonstration.

During fascism

After the march on Rome (1922) the purely fascist chants such as "Giovinezza" (or "Inno Trionfale del Partito Nazionale Fascista") took on great importance, which were widely disseminated and publicized, as well as taught in schools, although they were not official hymns. In this context the non-fascist melodies were discouraged, and "Il Canto degli Italiani" was not an exception. In 1932 the secretary of the National Fascist Party Achille Starace decided to prohibit the musical pieces that did not sing to Benito Mussolini and, more generally, those not directly linked to fascism.

Thus the tracks judged to be subversive, i.e. those of anarchist or socialist type, such as the hymn of the workers or "The Internationale", and the official hymns of foreign nations not sympathizing with fascism, such as "La Marseillaise", were banned. After the signing of the Lateran Treaty between the Kingdom of Italy and the Holy See (1929), anti-clerical passages were also banned. The chants used during the Italian unification were however tolerated: "Il Canto degli Italiani", which was forbidden in official ceremonies, was granted a certain condescension only on particular occasions.

In the spirit of this directive, for example, songs such as the Nazi hymn "Horst-Wessel-Lied" and the Francoist song "Cara al Sol" were encouraged, as they were official musical pieces from regimes akin to that led by Benito Mussolini. Otherwise, some songs were resized, such as "La leggenda del Piave", sung almost exclusively during the National Unity and Armed Forces Day every 4 November.

During the Second World War, fascist pieces composed by regime musicians were released, also via radio: there were very few songs spontaneously born among the population. In the years of the second war were common songs like "A primavera viene il bello", "Battaglioni M", "Vincere!" and "Camerata Richard", while, among the spontaneously born songs, the most famous was On the "Sul ponte di Perati".

After the armistice of 8 September 1943, the Italian government provisionally adopted as a national anthem, replacing the "Marcia Reale", "La leggenda del Piave": the Italian monarchy had in fact been questioned for having allowed the establishment of the fascist dictatorship; recalling the Italian victory in the First World War, it could infuse courage and hope to the troops of the Royal Italian Army who fought the Italian Social Republic of Benito Mussolini and the Nazi Germany.

In this context, "Fratelli d'Italia", along with other songs used during Italian unification and partisan songs, resounded in Southern Italy freed by the Allies and in the areas controlled by the partisans north of the war front. "Il Canto degli Italiani", in particular, had a good success in anti-fascist circles, where it joined the partisan songs "Fischia il vento" and "Bella ciao". Some scholars believe that the success of the piece in anti-fascist circles was then decisive for its choice as a provisional anthem of the Italian Republic.

Often, "Il Canto degli Italiani" is wrongly referred to as the national anthem of the Italian Social Republic of Benito Mussolini. However, the lack of an official national anthem of the Republic of Mussolini is documented: in fact, "Il Canto degli Italiani" or "Giovinezza" was performed in the ceremonies. "Il Canto degli Italiani" and - more generally - the themes referring to unification of Italy were used by the Republic of Mussolini, with a change of course compared to the past, for propaganda purposes only.

So Mameli's hymn was, curiously, sung by both the Italian partisans and the people who supported the Italian Social Republic (fascists).

From provisional to official anthem

In 1945, at the end of the war, Arturo Toscanini directed the performance of the Inno delle nazioni in London, composed by Giuseppe Verdi in 1862 and including "Il Canto degli Italiani"; however, as a provisional national anthem, even after the birth of the Italian Republic, "La leggenda del Piave" was temporarily confirmed.

For the choice of the national anthem a debate was opened which identified, among the possible options: the "Va, pensiero" from Giuseppe Verdi's Nabucco, the drafting of a completely new musical piece, "Il Canto degli Italiani", the "Inno di Garibaldi" and the confirmation of "La Leggenda del Piave". The political class of the time then approved the proposal of the War Minister Cipriano Facchinetti, who foresaw the adoption of "Il Canto degli Italiani" as a provisional anthem of the State.

"La Leggenda del Piave" then had the function of national anthem of the Italian Republic until the Council of Ministers of 12 October 1946, when Cipriano Facchinetti (of republican political belief), officially announced that during the celebrations of 4 November for National Unity and Armed Forces Day, in which the armed services of the republic will perform their oath of loyalty to the young republic, as provisional anthem, "Il Canto degli Italiani" would have been adopted. The press release stated that:

Facchinetti also declared that a draft decree would be proposed which would confirm "Il Canto degli Italiani" as the provisional national anthem of the newly formed Republic, an intention which, however, was not followed up.

Facchinetti proposed to formalize "Il Canto degli Italiani" in the Constitution of Italy, in preparation at that time, but without success. The Constitution, which came into force in 1948, sanctioned, in article 12, the use of the flag of Italy as a national flag, but did not establish what the national anthem would be, nor even the national symbol of Italy, which was later adopted by legislative decree dated 5 May 1948.

A draft constitutional law prepared in the immediate post-war period whose final objective was the insertion, in article 12, of the paragraph "The Anthem of the Republic is the "Il Canto degli Italiani"" was not followed, as well as the hypothesis of a decree presidential election that issued a specific regulation.

"Il Canto degli Italiani" then had a great success among Italian emigrants: scores of "Fratelli d'Italia" can be found, together with the flag of Italy, in many shops of the various Little Italy scattered in the Anglosphere. "Il Canto degli Italiani" is often played on more or less official occasions in North and South America: in particular, it was the "soundtrack" of the fundraisers destined to the Italian population leaving devastated by the conflict, which were organized in the second post-war period in the Americas.

It was the President of the Republic Carlo Azeglio Ciampi, in charge from 1999 to 2006, to activate a work of valorisation and re-launch of "Il Canto degli Italiani" as one of the national symbol of Italy. With reference to "Il Canto degli Italiani", Ciampi declared that:

In August 2016, a bill was submitted to the Constitutional Affairs Committee of the Chamber of Deputies to make "Il Canto degli Italiani" Italy's national anthem. In July 2017, the committee approved this bill. On 15 December 2017, onGazzetta Ufficiale law nº 181 of 4 December 2017 was published after passing both houses of Parliament, and the law came into force on 30 December 2017.

Lyrics

This is the complete text of the Italian anthem, as commonly performed in official occasions. The original poem written by Goffredo Mameli does not include the repetitions nor the loud "" ("Yes!") at the end of the chorus.

The first strophe presents the personification of Italy who is ready to go to war to become free, and shall be victorious as Rome was in ancient times, "wearing" the helmet of Scipio Africanus who defeated Hannibal at the final battle of the Second Punic War at Zama; there is also a reference to the ancient Roman custom of slaves who used to cut their hair short as a sign of servitude, hence the Goddess of Victory must cut her hair in order to be slave of Rome (to make Italy victorious).

In the second strophe the author complains that Italy has been a divided nation for a long time, and calls for unity; in this strophe Goffredo Mameli uses three words taken from the Italian poetic and archaic language: ,  (modern ),  (modern ).

The third strophe is an invocation to God to protect the loving union of the Italians struggling to unify their nation once and for all. The fourth strophe recalls popular heroic figures and moments of the Italian fight for independence such as the battle of Legnano, the defence of Florence led by Ferruccio during the Italian Wars, the riot started in Genoa by Balilla, and the Sicilian Vespers. The fifth strophe of the poem refers to the part played by Habsburg Austria and Czarist Russia in the partitions of Poland, linking its quest for independence to the Italian one.

The sixth and final verse, which is almost never performed, is missing in Mameli's original draft but appears in his second manuscript, however it was omitted in the first printed editions of the text on leaflet. The verse joyfully announces the unity of Italy and goes on to close the song with the same six lines that conclude the initial verse, thus giving the poem a circular structure.

Music 

Novaro's musical composition is written in a typical marching time (4/4) in the key of B-flat major. It has a catchy character and an easy melodic line that simplifies memory and execution.

On the other hand, on the harmonic and rhythmic level, the composition presents a greater complexity, which is particularly evident from bar 31, with the important final modulation in the near tone of E-flat major, and with the agogic variation from the initial Allegro martial to a more lively Allegro mosso, which results in an accelerando. This second characteristic is well recognizable especially in the most accredited engravings of the autograph score.

From a musical point of view, the piece is divided into three parts: the introduction, the strophes and the refrain.

The introduction consists of twelve bars, characterized by a dactyl rhythm that alternates one eighth note sixteenth note. The first eight bars present a bipartite harmonic succession between B flat major and G minor, alternating with the respective dominant chords (F major and D major seventh. This section is only instrumental. The last four bars, introducing the actual song, return to B flat.

The strophes therefore attack in B♭ and are characterized by the repetition of the same melodic unit, replicated in various degrees and at different pitch. Each melodic unit corresponds to a fragment of the Mamelian hexasyllable, whose emphatic rhythm enthused Novaro, who set it to music according to the classical scheme of dividing the verse into two parts ("Fratelli / d'Italia / Italia / s'è desta").

However, there is also an unusual choice, since the usual leap of a correct interval does not correspond to the anacrusic rhythm: on the contrary, the verses «Fratelli / d'Italia» and «dell'elmo / di Scipio» carry each one, at the beginning, two identical notes (F o D depending on the case). This partly weakens the accentuation of the syllable in beat to the advantage of the upbeat one, and produces audibly a syncopated effect, contrasting the natural short-long succession of the paroxytone verse.

On the strong tempo of the basic melodic unit we perform an unequal group of pointed eighth note and sixteenth note.

Some musical re-readings of the "Il Canto degli Italiani" intended to give greater prominence to the melodic aspect of the song, and have therefore softened this rhythmic scan bringing it closer to that of two notes of the same duration (eighth note).

At bar 31, again with an unusual choice, the key changes to E flat major until the end of the melody, yielding only to the relative minor in the performance of the tercet "Stringiamci a coorte /siam pronti alla morte / L'Italia chiamò", while time becomes an Allegro mosso. Also the refrain is characterized by a melodic unit replicated several times; dynamically, in the last five bars it grows in intensity, passing from pianissimo to forte and to fortissimo with the indication crescendo e accelerando sino alla fine ("growing and accelerating to the end").

Recordings

The copyrights have lapsed; the work is in the public domain, the two authors having been dead for more than 70 years. Novaro never asked for compensation for printing music, ascribing his work to the patriotic cause. Giuseppe Magrini, who made the first print of "Il Canto degli Italiani", asked only for a certain number of printed copies for personal use. In 1859, Novaro, at Tito Ricordi's request to reprint the text of the song with his publishing house, ordered that the money be directly paid in favor of a subscription for Giuseppe Garibaldi.

The score of "Il Canto degli Italiani" is instead owned by the publisher Sonzogno, which therefore has the possibility of making the official prints of the piece.

The oldest known sound recording of "Il Canto degli Italiani" (disc at 78 rpm for gramophone, 17 cm in diameter) is dated 1901 and was recorded by the Municipal Band of Milan under the direction of Pio Nevi.

One of the first recordings of "Fratelli d'Italia" was that of 9 June 1915, which was performed by the Neapolitan opera and music singer Giuseppe Godono. The song was recorded for the Phonotype label of Naples.

Another ancient recording received is that of the Gramophone Band, recorded in London for His Master's Voice on 23 January 1918.

During events
Over the years a public ceremonial has been established for the anthem's performance, which is still in force. According to the custom, whenever the anthem is played, if in an outdoor military ceremony personnel in formation present arms while personnel not in formation stand at attention (unless when saluting during the raising and lowering of the national flag, as well as the trooping of the national flag for service or unit decorations). If indoors (including military band concerts), all personnel stand at attention.  Civilians, if they wish, can also put themselves to attention.

According to the ceremonial, on the occasion of official events, only the first two stanzas should be performed without the introduction. If the event is institutional, and a foreign hymn must also be performed, this is played first as an act of courtesy.

In 1970 the obligation, however, remained almost always unfulfilled, to perform the "Ode to Joy" of Ludwig van Beethoven, that is the official anthem of Europe, whenever "Il Canto degli Italiani" is played.

Notes

References

Works cited

External links

Page on the official site of the Quirinale, residence of the Head of State(in Italian with several recorded performances – click on ascolta l'Inno and choose a file to listen)

Streaming audio, lyrics and information about the Italian national anthem
Listen to the Italian national anthem
 (Version for chorus and piano by Claudio Dall'Albero on a musical proposal of Luciano Berio)

1847 songs
European anthems
Italian culture
National symbols of Italy
Italian patriotic songs
Italy–Poland relations
Italian anthems
National anthems
National anthem compositions in B-flat major
National anthem compositions in E-flat major
Songs based on poems